The Eddy-class coastal tankers were Royal Fleet Auxiliary Replenishment oilers built from 1951–1953 tasked with transporting and providing fuel and other liquids to Royal Navy vessels and stations around the world. There were originally ten ships planned in the class, although the final two were cancelled in 1952. Originally designed to act as fleet attendant oilers, in this role the ships were obsolete almost as soon as they were built due to the increasing prevalence of replenishment at sea, and their role was refocused to coastal transport duties. 

Most of the class had relatively short service careers, although Eddyfirth remained in service until 1981. Several of the vessels were based at Gibraltar in the Mediterranean for most of their service years.

Ships

See also
 T1 tanker US coastal tanker
 T2 tanker 
 T3 Tanker 
Replenishment oiler

References

 Eddy-Class Coastal Tankers
 Historical RFA

Auxiliary replenishment ship classes
 Ol